The women's 1500 metres at the 2012 IAAF World Indoor Championships took place March 9 and 10 at the Ataköy Athletics Arena. Four of the fifteen participants were later found out to be doping, including the original bronze medallist, Aslı Çakır Alptekin.

Medalists

Records

Qualification standards

Schedule

Results

Heats

Qualification: First 3 of each heat (Q) plus the 3 fastest qualified (q).  15 athletes from 12 countries participated.

Final

9 athletes from 8 countries participated.

References

1500 metres
1500 metres at the World Athletics Indoor Championships
2012 in women's athletics